Selim Bouadla (born 26 August 1988) is a French-Algerian professional footballer who played as a midfielder most recently for Laval.

Club career

Le Havre
Bouadla was born in Rosny-sous-Bois, Seine-Saint-Denis. He made his Ligue 2 debut with Le Havre AC on 27 July 2007 against SC Bastia. He made his Ligue 1 debut on 20 September 2008, coming on as a substitute against Lyon. On 3 February 2009, he moved on loan to Paris FC.

Debrecen
On 1 May 2012, Bouadla won the Hungarian Cup with Debrecen by beating MTK Budapest on penalty shoot-out in the 2011–12 season. This was the fifth Hungarian Cup trophy for Debrecen.

On 12 May 2012, Bouadla won the Hungarian League title with Debrecen after beating Pécs in the 28th round of the Hungarian League by 4–0 at the Oláh Gábor út Stadium which resulted the sixth Hungarian League title for the Hajdús.

Académica
On 18 June 2015, Bouadla signed a two-year deal with Académica. He made his debut in the Primeira Liga on 17 August 2015 in a game against Paços de Ferreira.

Slaven Belupo
On 17 August 2016, after suffering top division relegation with Académica, Bouadla signed a two-year deal with Croatian club Slaven Belupo.

Lavall
Bouadla signed a contract with Stade Lavallois in June 2018. He was released at the end of the 2019–20 season.

Career statistics

Honours
Le Havre
 Ligue 2 Championship: 2008

Debrecen
 Hungarian League: 2012, 2014
 Hungarian Cup: 2012, 2013

References

External links
 LFP Profile

1988 births
Living people
People from Rosny-sous-Bois
French sportspeople of Algerian descent
Algerian footballers
French footballers
US Torcy players
Le Havre AC players
Paris FC players
Debreceni VSC players
Associação Académica de Coimbra – O.A.F. players
NK Slaven Belupo players
Stade Lavallois players
Ligue 1 players
Ligue 2 players
Championnat National players
Nemzeti Bajnokság I players
Primeira Liga players
Croatian Football League players
Algerian expatriate footballers
French expatriate footballers
Expatriate footballers in France
Expatriate footballers in Hungary
Expatriate footballers in Portugal
Expatriate footballers in Croatia
Algerian expatriate sportspeople in France
Algerian expatriate sportspeople in Hungary
Algerian expatriate sportspeople in Portugal
French expatriate sportspeople in Hungary
French expatriate sportspeople in Portugal
Association football midfielders
Footballers from Seine-Saint-Denis